Antelope Creek is a stream in the U.S. state of South Dakota.

Antelope Creek was named on account of antelope which frequented the area.

See also
List of rivers of South Dakota

References

Rivers of Day County, South Dakota
Rivers of South Dakota